Swing It, Sailor! is a 1938 American film directed by actor/screenwriter Raymond Cannon.

Plot summary 
Sailor Husky proposes marriage to every girl in every port. He can't swim, and is ready to be discharged from the Navy, but he's always helping his pal, Pete. Pete would hate to see Husky leave, as Pete has to do all the work himself. Husky's new girl is Myrtle, who goes through men like Kleenex, trolling for a well-heeled catch. Pete tries to save his friend from her; but, is it only for himself? It looks like they are in for a fight.

Cast 
Wallace Ford as Pete Kelly
Ray Mayer as Husky Stone
Isabel Jewell as Myrtle Montrose
Mary Treen as Gertie Burns
Max Hoffman Jr. as Bos'n Hardy
Cully Richards as Shamus O'Shay
George Humbert as Pet Shop Proprietor
Tom Kennedy as Policeman
Alexander Leftwich as Captain
Kenneth Harlan as First Officer
Archie Robbins as Second Officer
Kernan Cripps as Doctor
Rex Lease as Intern

External links 

1938 films
American black-and-white films
American adventure comedy films
Grand National Films films
1930s adventure comedy films
1938 comedy films
FIlms directed by Raymond Cannon (actor)
1930s English-language films
1930s American films